Laura E. Alvarez born August 8, 1969, in Huntington Beach, California is a visual artist.

Background 

In 1992, Alvarez earned a Bachelor of Arts from University of California, Santa Cruz with an emphasis in printmaking and a Master of Fine Arts with an emphasis in painting from San Francisco Art Institute in 1996.

Art 

 Alvarez's Double Agent Sirvienta (D.A.S) series is an on-going project consisting of prints, paintings, music, short films and a rock opera. This series features a spy posing as a domestic worker. This project began in 1995.
 The Double Agent Sirvienta Rock Opera, 1996-1998 is a multimedia film and music project which illustrates the story of a young female soap opera actress relegated to portraying maids who becomes a spy.
 The Double Agent Sirvienta: Blow Up the Hard Drive, Serigraph, 1999 is in the permanent collections of the Los Angeles County Museum of Art and the Smithsonian American Art Museum.

Selected exhibitions 
 DAS:  Clothes Stories, Pasadena City College, Pasadena, California 2017
 Borderless Dreams, Oceanside Museum of Art, Oceanside, California 2005
 Chicano Art for our Millennium, Mesa Southwest Museum, Tempe, Arizona 2004
 Mixed Feelings, (featuring a commissioned film) USC Fisher Gallery, Los Angeles, California 2002
 Revelatory Landscapes, in collaboration with ADOBE L.A., San Francisco Museum of Modern Art, San Francisco, California 2001
 Revealing and Concealing:  Portraits and Identity, Skirball Cultural Center, Los Angeles, California 2000
 Annual Print Exhibition, (Atelier de Mujeres), Self Help Graphics & Art, Los Angeles, California 1999

Further reading

References

External links 
 
 paradisoarts.com

Chicano art
People from Huntington Beach, California
1969 births
University of California, Santa Cruz alumni
San Francisco Art Institute alumni
American women artists
Living people
Artists from California
21st-century American women